Adrian Gibson  (3 November 1935 – 30 April 2015) was an Australian politician. Born in Hobart, Tasmania, he was educated there at Hutchins School and at the University of Tasmania where he graduated with a Bachelor of Laws in 1959. He became a barrister in 1959, as well as a company director and grazier. In 1964, he was elected to the Australian House of Representatives as a member of the Liberal Party, winning a by-election for the seat of Denison. He held the seat until his retirement in 1969.

Gibson was awarded the Medal of the Order of Australia (OAM) on Australia Day, 2014, for service to the arts, to agriculture, and to the Parliament of Australia. He resided in Armadale, Victoria. Gibson died on 30 April 2015.

References

1935 births
2015 deaths
Liberal Party of Australia members of the Parliament of Australia
Members of the Australian House of Representatives for Denison
Members of the Australian House of Representatives
Recipients of the Medal of the Order of Australia
20th-century Australian politicians
Politicians from Hobart
University of Tasmania alumni